A nightcap is a drink taken shortly before bedtime. For example, a small alcoholic drink or glass of warm milk can supposedly promote a good night's sleep.

Alcoholic nightcaps and sleep

Nightcaps can be neat or mixed. They should not be served chilled or on the rocks, because their point is to induce a feeling of warmth. The hot toddy is usually considered the original nightcap. Other traditional nightcaps include brown liquor like brandy or bourbon, and cream-based liqueurs such as Irish cream. Wine, especially fortified, can also function as a nightcap. Since some nightcaps are made of amaro, a digestif, they are believed to also make settling into bed easier by promoting digestion.

In folk medicine, consuming a nightcap is for the purpose of inducing sleep. Alcohol is not recommended by many doctors as a sleep aid because it interferes with sleep quality.  But, in low doses, alcohol has sleep-promoting benefits, and some popular sleep medicines include 10% alcohol, although the effects of alcohol upon sleep can wear off somewhat after several nights of consecutive use.

Non-alcoholic
A nightcap was originally alcoholic, since it makes the drinker feel warm and helps them sleep, just like the garment of the same name. However, warm milk is often recommended as a nightcap for inducing sleep. It contains both tryptophan and calcium.  Alternatively, honey can improve the flavor. The effectiveness of warm milk for inducing sleep is disputed.

In 1930, Ovaltine was advertised as "the world's best 'night-cap' to ensure sound, natural sleep".

See also
Apéritif and digestif
Sleep hygiene

References

External links

 .
 .

Drinking culture
Sleep medicine